This is a list of cruisers of the Imperial Japanese Navy built between 1885 and 1945.

Armoured cruisers (Sōkō jun'yōkan)

Note that the four Tsukuba and Ibuki class armoured cruisers were re-classed as "battlecruisers" by the Imperial Japanese Navy in 1912.

Battlecruisers (jun'yōsenkan)

Heavy cruisers (jū jun'yōkan)

Protected cruisers (Bōgo jun'yōkan) & unprotected cruisers (Mubōbina jun'yōkan)

Light cruisers (Kei jun'yōkan)

See also
List of Japanese battleships
List of Japanese battlecruisers
List of destroyers of Japan
Submarines of the Imperial Japanese Navy

Japan